Prasoet Manukit Road or Highway 351, commonly known as Kaset-Nawamin Road, is a highway in Bangkok, Thailand. It begins at Kasetsart Intersection on Phahonyothin Road, Chatuchak district, as a continuation after the end of Ngamwongwan Road, and runs east until its end at a three-way intersection with Nawamin Road, in Bueng Kum district. Its total length is 9.178 km.

Construction on the road was completed in 2003. The Bangkok Road Naming Commission formally changed its name to Prasoet Manukit Road in 2006. However, in popular practice and on many maps, Kaset-Nawamin Road is still common.

The name Prasoet Manukit Road was originally assigned by the Streetin 2003 to the section of Pradit Manutham Road between Rama IX Road and Lat Phrao Road. This change was met with complaints from the public, and in 2004 the road's name was changed back. Then, in 2009, the name was assigned to Highway 351 instead.

References

External links
 Thailand Route 351 on Google Maps.

National highways in Thailand